Alamouti is a Persian surname. Notable people with the surname include:

Kaveh Alamouti (born 1954), British-Iranian investment banker
Noureddin Alamouti, Iranian judge and politician
Siavash Alamouti (born 1962), Iranian-American engineer

Persian-language surnames